Social Consumerism occurs when the consumer's needs are met, the business achieves profitability and a social issue is positively affected. This is very different than traditional business models where only the first two objectives are achieved.

The value of social consumerism is that it takes the responsibility of the charitable donation away from the consumer and ties the philanthropic action to what consumers do naturally (e.g. eat out and part of the tab goes to a food charity.)

As many as 92% of moms and 88% of millennials want to buy from organizations that support a good cause.

References

Business terms
Social concepts